Rock Branch is an unincorporated community in Woodbury County, in the U.S. state of Iowa.

History
A post office was established at Rock Branch in 1872, and remained in operation until 1904. The community took its name from Rock Creek. Little remains of the original community.

References

Geography of Woodbury County, Iowa